The Monnard was a French automobile manufactured only in 1899.  It was a light four-seater electric dogcart.

References
David Burgess Wise, The New Illustrated Encyclopedia of Automobiles.

Defunct motor vehicle manufacturers of France
Electric vehicles introduced in the 20th century